Steven Joseph Suhey (January 8, 1922 – January 8, 1977) was a former professional American football player, playing guard for two seasons in the National Football League for the Pittsburgh Steelers. He was an All-American at Penn State. He was inducted into the College Football Hall of Fame in 1985. His son Matt Suhey also played at Penn State and in the NFL.

Penn State
Suhey's college career was interrupted by three years of service in the United States Army Air Corps during World War II.

Suhey was the MVP of the 1948 Cotton Bowl Classic. It has been suggested Penn State's now-famous "We Are Penn State!" stadium cheer has its origins in a statement made by team captain Suhey prior to that game. Suhey is said to have declared, “We are Penn State. There will be no meetings,” in response to SMU's request for a meeting to protest the participation of Penn State's two black players (Wallace Triplett and Dennie Hoggard).

While at Penn State, Suhey became a member of Sigma Pi fraternity.

Personal life
After playing two seasons in the NFL with the Pittsburgh Steelers, Suhey coached high school football before joining the L.G. Balfour Company.

"First family of Nittany Lion football"
Suhey married Virginia "Ginger" Higgins, a daughter of Bob Higgins, a former All-American at Penn State and Suhey's college coach. Three of their sons, Larry, Paul, and Matt, were lettermen at Penn State from 1975–1979. Matt would go on to play 10 seasons in the NFL with the Chicago Bears. One grandson, Kevin Suhey, was a quarterback and special teams player for the Nittany Lions from 2005–2007 and another grandson, Joe Suhey, was a running back for Penn State from 2007–2010. The Higgins-Suhey family has been called the "first family of Nittany Lion football", with 90 years of involvement with the Penn State football program.

References

1922 births
1977 deaths
People from State College, Pennsylvania
United States Army Air Forces personnel of World War II
American football offensive linemen
Penn State Nittany Lions football players
Pittsburgh Steelers players
College Football Hall of Fame inductees
People from DeWitt, New York